Poupartiopsis is a monotypic genus of flowering plants belonging to the family Anacardiaceae. The only species is Poupartiopsis spondiocarpus.

Description
It is a modest-sized forest tree.

Range and habitat
Poupartiopsis spondiocarpus is native to Madagascar. It is found in sandy coastal forests along Madagascar's east coast.

Name
The genus name of Poupartiopsis is in honour of François Poupart (d. 1708), a French physician, anatomist and entomologist. The Latin specific epithet of spondiocarpus refers to the similarity of the internal structure of its fruit to that of the genus Spondias Both the genus and the species were first described and published in Syst. Bot. Vol.31 on page 338 in 2006.

References

Anacardiaceae
Anacardiaceae genera
Monotypic Sapindales genera
Plants described in 2006
Endemic flora of Madagascar
Flora of the Madagascar lowland forests